Anne Ross (born 17 March 1985 in Dersum, Lower Saxony) is a German singer.

She was a member of the German pop girl group, Preluders. After Preluders disbanded, she and Manel Filali teamed up to form the duo Milk & Honey.

References

External links
 Milk & Honey website 

1985 births
Living people
People from Emsland
German women pop singers
21st-century German women singers